Diplodactylus laevis, sometimes called the desert fat-tailed gecko, is a gecko endemic to Australia.

References

Diplodactylus
Reptiles described in 1925
Taxa named by Richard Sternfeld
Geckos of Australia